Konopki  is a village in the administrative district of Gmina Bakałarzewo, within Suwałki County, of Podlaskie Voivodeship, in north-eastern Poland. It is close to the border.

References

Villages in Suwałki County